Georges Gonthier is a Canadian computer scientist and one of the leading practitioners in formal mathematics.  He led the formalization of the four color theorem and Feit–Thompson proof of the odd-order theorem.  (Both were written using the proof assistant Coq.)

See also 
 Flyspeck proof led by Thomas Callister Hales

References 
 Personal Page at Microsoft Research
 Paper describing proof of the Four color theorem
 phys.org news article describing Feit-Thompson proof
 Press release from INRIA with links to Coq code of Feit-Thompson Proof

20th-century  Canadian mathematicians
Living people
Year of birth missing (living people)